Acolbifene (developmental code names EM-652, SCH-57068) is a nonsteroidal selective estrogen receptor modulator (SERM) which, as of 2015, is in phase III clinical trials for the treatment of breast cancer.

See also 
 Acolbifene/prasterone
 List of investigational sex-hormonal agents § Estrogenics

References

External links 
 Acolbifene - AdisInsight

Benzopyrans
Hormonal antineoplastic drugs
Phenols
1-Piperidinyl compounds
Selective estrogen receptor modulators